Ben Mezrich (born February 7, 1969) is an American author.

Early life and education
Mezrich was born in Boston, Massachusetts, the son of Molli Newman, a lawyer, and Reuben Mezrich, a chairman of radiology at the University of Maryland School of Medicine. He has two brothers, including Josh Mezrich. He was raised in a Conservative Jewish household, and attended Princeton Day School, in Princeton, New Jersey. He graduated magna cum laude with a degree in Social Studies from Harvard University in 1991.

Personal life
Mezrich has been married to Tonya M. Chen since 2006. 
Some of his books have been written under the pen-name Holden Scott. Mezrich is known for his non-fiction books. He lives in Boston.

Written work
Mezrich is best known for his first non-fiction work, Bringing Down the House: The Inside Story of Six MIT Students Who Took Vegas for Millions. This book tells the story of a group of students from MIT who bet on blackjack games using a sophisticated card counting system, earning millions of dollars at casinos in Las Vegas and other gambling centers in the United States and the Caribbean. The story was made into the movie 21, released in 2008. Despite being categorized as non-fiction many of the characters in Bringing Down the House are composite characters and some of the events described have been contested by the people the characters are based on.

In 2004, Mezrich published a new book called  Ugly Americans: The True Story of the Ivy League Cowboys Who Raided the Asian Markets for Millions. Also a nonfiction work, this book recounts the exploits of an American named John Malcolm, who was an assistant securities trader.

In 2005 Mezrich published Busting Vegas: The MIT Whiz Kid Who Brought the Casinos to Their Knees a semi-sequel to Bringing Down the House. The book tells the story of another student involved in a similar Blackjack team, but one that used more advanced techniques than the ones discussed in the first book. As with Bringing Down the House many of the events depicted in Busting Vegas were later contested by main character Semyon Dukach who described the book as  "only about half true".

In 2007, Mezrich published Rigged which recounts the formation of what would eventually become the Dubai Mercantile Exchange by two young visionaries, one in the New York Mercantile Exchange and the other in the Dubai Ministry of Finance.

Mezrich published a new book in July 2009 about Mark Zuckerberg, the founder of Facebook, titled The Accidental Billionaires: The Founding of Facebook, A Tale of Sex, Money, Genius, and Betrayal. It debuted at No. 4 on The New York Times Nonfiction Bestseller List, and No. 1 on The Boston Globe Nonfiction Bestseller List." Aaron Sorkin adapted the book for the screenplay of the film The Social Network, which was released on October 1, 2010. It was directed by David Fincher and stars Jesse Eisenberg as Mark Zuckerberg and Andrew Garfield as Eduardo Saverin. 10 years later, in May 2019, Mezrich published a sequel featuring Cameron and Tyler Winklevoss, titled Bitcoin Billionaires: A True Story of Genius, Betrayal, and Redemption.

2014 saw the release of Seven Wonders, Mezrich's first novel since The Carrier in 2001. Seven Wonders is "a fast-moving thriller involving murder, conspiracy, historical mystery, and the Seven Wonders of the World," according to Booklist. Publishers Weekly wrote that "Mezrich has written a rollicking adventure with a fantastic behind-the-scenes tour of some of the world's most intriguing spots".

His 2021 book, The Antisocial Network: The GameStop Short Squeeze and the Ragtag Group of Amateur Traders That Brought Wall Street to Its Knees, will be adapted to film entitled Dumb Money by Metro Goldwyn Mayer and directed by Craig Gillespie.

Books

Fiction 
Threshold (1996) 
Reaper (1998) 
Fertile Ground (1999) 
The X-Files: Skin, (2000) 
Skeptic (written under the pen name Holden Scott), (2000)
The Carrier (written under the pen name Holden Scott), (2001)
 Seven Wonders (2014)
 The Midnight Ride (2022)

Non-fiction 
 Bringing Down the House: The Inside Story of Six MIT Students Who Took Vegas for Millions (2002)
 Ugly Americans: The True Story of the Ivy League Cowboys Who Raided the Asian Markets for Millions (2004)
 Busting Vega$: The MIT Whiz Kid Who Brought the Casinos to Their Knees (2005)
 Rigged: The Story of an Ivy League Kid Who Changed the World of Oil, From Wall Street to Dubai (2007)
 The Accidental Billionaires: The Founding of Facebook, A Tale of Sex, Money, Genius, and Betrayal (2009)
 Sex on the Moon: The Amazing Story Behind the Most Audacious Heist in History  (2011)
 Straight Flush: The True Story of Six College Friends Who Dealt Their Way to a Billion-Dollar Online Poker Empire—and How It All Came Crashing Down ... (2013)
 Once Upon a Time in Russia: The Rise of the Oligarchs—A True Story of Ambition, Wealth, Betrayal, and Murder (2015)
 The 37th Parallel: The Secret Truth Behind America's UFO Highway (2016)
 Woolly: The True Story of the Quest to Revive One of History's Most Iconic Extinct Creatures (2017)
Bitcoin Billionaires: A True Story of Genius, Betrayal, and Redemption (2019)
 The Antisocial Network: The GameStop Short Squeeze and the Ragtag Group of Amateur Traders That Brought Wall Street to Its Knees (2021, Grand Central / Hachette)

Juvenile fiction 
Bringing Down the Mouse (2014)
Charlie Numbers and the Man in the Moon (2017)  
Charlie Numbers and the Woolly Mammoth (2019)

Other projects
Mezrich was the co-host of season 3 of the GSN series The World Series of Blackjack and the World Blackjack Tour. He also represented Massachusetts as a contestant in the Sexiest Bachelor in America Pageant on Fox in 2000. Fatal Error is a TBS premiere movie adaptation of his second book, Reaper, starring Antonio Sabato, Jr. and Robert Wagner. Skin was originally written as an X-Files episode. Rigged was optioned by Mark Cuban's 2929 as well as "Q," a work of fiction by Mezrich. Ugly Americans has been optioned by Summit, with a screenplay written by Robert Schenkkan, Pulitzer Prize-winning writer of The Quiet American, and also a draft completed by Mezrich himself.

References

External links

Poker Moments Interview, September 24, 2010 

In Depth interview with Mezrich, November 6, 2011

American gambling writers
20th-century American novelists
21st-century American novelists
American male novelists
Harvard University alumni
People from Princeton, New Jersey
Writers from Boston
20th-century American Jews
1969 births
Living people
Princeton Day School alumni
20th-century American male writers
21st-century American male writers
Novelists from Massachusetts
20th-century American non-fiction writers
21st-century American non-fiction writers
American male non-fiction writers
21st-century American Jews